Anthony James Arnaud Watson (1910-1970) was a male athlete who competed for England.

Athletics career
He competed for England in the shot put at the 1934 British Empire Games in London.

References

1910 births
1970 deaths
English male shot putters
Athletes (track and field) at the 1934 British Empire Games
Commonwealth Games competitors for England